Tigranes II, more commonly known as Tigranes the Great (Tigran Mets;  Tigránes ho Mégas) (140 – 55 BC), was King of Armenia under whom the country became, for a short time, the strongest state to Rome's east. He was a member of the Artaxiad Royal House. Under his reign, the Armenian kingdom expanded beyond its traditional boundaries, allowing Tigranes to claim the title Great King, and involving Armenia in many battles against opponents such as the Parthian and Seleucid Empires, and the Roman Republic.

Early years
In approximately 120 BC, the Parthian king Mithridates II invaded Armenia and made its king Artavasdes I acknowledge Parthian suzerainty. Artavasdes I was forced to give the Parthians Tigranes, who was either his son or nephew, as a hostage. Tigranes lived in the Parthian court at Ctesiphon, where he was schooled in Parthian culture. Tigranes remained a hostage at the Parthian court until , when Mithridates II released him and appointed him as the king of Armenia. Tigranes ceded an area called "seventy valleys" in the Caspiane to Mithridates II, either as a pledge or because Mithridates II demanded it. Tigranes' daughter Ariazate had also married a son of Mithridates II, which has been suggested by the modern historian Edward Dąbrowa to have taken place shortly before he ascended the Armenian throne as a guarantee of his loyalty. Tigranes would remain a Parthian vassal until the late 80s BC.

When he came to power, the foundation upon which Tigranes was to build his Empire was already in place, a legacy of the founder of the Artaxiad Dynasty, Artaxias I, and subsequent kings. The mountains of Armenia, however, formed natural borders between the different regions of the country and as a result, the feudalistic nakharars had significant influence over the regions or provinces in which they were based. This did not suit Tigranes, who wanted to create a centralist empire. He thus proceeded by consolidating his power within Armenia before embarking on his campaign.

He deposed Artanes, the last king of the Kingdom of Sophene and a descendant of Zariadres.

Alliance with Pontus

During the First Mithridatic War (89–85 BC), Tigranes supported Mithridates VI of Pontus, but was careful not to become directly involved in the war.

He rapidly built up his power and established an alliance with Mithridates VI, marrying his daughter Cleopatra. Tigranes agreed to extend his influence in the East, while Mithridates set to conquer Roman land in Asia Minor and in Europe. By creating a stronger Hellenistic state, Mithridates was to contend with the well-established Roman foothold in Europe. Mithridates executed a planned general attack on Romans and Italians in Asia Minor, tapping into local discontent with the Romans and their taxes and urging the peoples of Asia Minor to raise against foreign influence. The slaughter of 80,000 people in the province of Asia Minor was known as the Asiatic Vespers. The two kings' attempts to control Cappadocia and then the massacres resulted in guaranteed Roman intervention. The senate decided that Lucius Cornelius Sulla, who was then one of the consuls, would command the army against Mithridates.

The renowned French historian René Grousset remarked that in their alliance Mithridates was somewhat subservient to Tigranes.

Wars against the Parthians and Seleucids 

After the death of Mithridates II of Parthia his son Gotarzes I succeeded him. He reigned during a period coined in scholarship as the "Parthian Dark Age," due to the lack of clear information on the events of this period in the empire, except a series of, apparently overlapping, reigns. This system of split monarchy weakened Parthia, allowing Tigranes II of Armenia to annex Parthian territory in western Mesopotamia. This land would not be restored to Parthia until the reign of Sinatruces (r. c. 78–69 BC).

In 83 BC, after bloody strife for the throne of Syria, governed by the Seleucids, the Syrians decided to choose Tigranes as the protector of their kingdom and offered him the crown of Syria. Magadates was appointed as his governor in Antioch.  He then conquered Phoenicia and Cilicia, effectively putting an end to the last remnants of the Seleucid Empire, though a few holdout cities appear to have recognized the shadowy boy-king Seleucus VII Philometor as the legitimate king during his reign. The southern border of his domain reached as far as Ptolemais (modern Akko). Many of the inhabitants of conquered cities were sent to his new metropolis of Tigranocerta.

At its height, his empire extended from the Pontic Alps (in modern north-eastern Turkey) to Mesopotamia, and from the Caspian Sea to the Mediterranean. A series of victories led him to assume the Achaemenid title of King of Kings, which even the Parthian kings did not assume, appearing on coins struck after 85 BC. He was called "Tigranes the Great" by many Western historians and writers, such as Plutarch. The "King of Kings" never appeared in public without having four kings attending him. Cicero, referring to his success in the east, said that he "made the Republic of Rome tremble before the prowess of his arms."

Tigranes' coins consist of tetradrachms and copper coins having on the obverse his portrait wearing a decorated Armenian tiara with ear-flaps. The reverse has a completely original design. There are the seated Tyche of Antioch and the river god Orontes at her feet.

Wars against Rome

Mithridates VI of Pontus had found refuge in Armenian land after confronting Rome, considering the fact that Tigranes was his ally and relative. The King of Kings eventually came into direct contact with Rome. The Roman commander, Lucullus, demanded the expulsion of Mithridates from Armenia – to comply with such a demand would be, in effect, to accept the status of vassal to Rome and thus Tigranes refused. Charles Rollin, in his Ancient History, says:

Lucullus' reaction was an attack that was so precipitate that he took Tigranes by surprise. According to Roman historians Mithrobazanes, one of Tigranes' generals, told Tigranes of the Roman approach. Tigranes was, according to Keaveney, so impressed by Mithrobazanes' courage that he appointed Mithrobazanes to command an army against Lucullus – Tigranes sent Mithrobarzanes with 2,000 to 3,000 cavalry to expel the invader. Mithrobarzanes charged the Romans while they were setting up their camp, but was met by a 3,500-strong sentry force and his horsemen were routed. He perished in the attempt. After this defeat, Tigranes withdrew north to Armenia to regroup, leaving Lucullus free to besiege Tigranocerta.

When Tigranes had gathered a large army, he returned to confront Lucullus.  On October 6, 69 BC, Tigranes' much larger force was decisively defeated by the Roman army under Lucullus in the Battle of Tigranocerta. Tigranes' treatment of the inhabitants (the majority of the population had been forced to move to the city) led disgruntled city guards to open the gates of the city to the Romans. Learning of this, Tigranes hurriedly sent 6000 cavalrymen to the city in order to rescue his wives and some of his assets. Tigranes escaped capture with a small escort.

On October 6, 68 BC, the Romans approached the old capital of Artaxata. Tigranes' and Mithridates' combined Armeno-Pontic army of 70,000 men formed up to face them but were resoundingly defeated. Once again, both Mithridates and Tigranes evaded capture by the victorious Romans. However, the Armenian historians claim that the Romans lost the battle of Artaxata and Lucullus' following withdrawal from the Kingdom of Armenia in reality was an escape due to the above-mentioned defeat. The Armenian-Roman wars are depicted in Alexandre Dumas' Voyage to the Caucasus.
 
The long campaigning and hardships that Lucullus' troops had endured for years, combined with a perceived lack of reward in the form of plunder, led to successive mutinies among the legions in 68–67. Frustrated by the rough terrain of Northern Armenia and seeing the worsening morale of his troops, Lucullus moved back south and put Nisibis under siege. Tigranes concluded (wrongly) that Nisibis would hold out and sought to regain those parts of Armenia that the Romans had captured. Despite his continuous success in battle, Lucullus could still not capture either one of the monarchs. With Lucullus' troops now refusing to obey his commands, but agreeing to defend positions from attack, the Senate sent Pompey to recall Lucullus to Rome and take over his command.

Pompey and submission to Rome

In 67 BC Pompey was given the task of defeating Mithridates and Tigranes. Pompey first concentrated on attacking Mithridates while distracting Tigranes by engineering a Parthian attack on Gordyene. Phraates III, the Parthian king, was soon persuaded to take things a little further than an annexation of Gordyene when a son of Tigranes (also named Tigranes) went to join the Parthians and persuaded Phraates to invade Armenia in an attempt to replace the elder Tigranes with the Tigranes the Younger. Tigranes decided not to meet the invasion in the field but instead ensured that his capital, Artaxata, was well defended and withdrew to the hill country. Phraates soon realized that Artaxata would not fall without a protracted siege, the time for which he could not spare due to his fear of plots at home. Once Phraates left, Tigranes came back down from the hills and drove his son from Armenia. The son then fled to Pompey.

In 66 BC, Pompey advanced into Armenia with Tigranes the Younger, and Tigranes, now almost 75 years old, surrendered. Pompey allowed him to retain his kingdom shorn of his conquests as he planned to have Armenia as a buffer state and he took 6,000 talents/180 tonnes of silver. His unfaithful son was sent back to Rome as a prisoner.

Tigranes continued to rule Armenia as a formal ally of Rome until his death in 55/54, at age 85.

Offspring
Tigranes had four sons and three daughters. The eldest son, Zariadres, according to Appian and Valerius Maximus rebelled against Tigranes and was killed during a battle (possibly late 90s BCE). Appian also mentions an unnamed younger son who was executed for conspiring against Tigranes: he disregarded his father's health and wore Tigranes's crown (Tigranes having been injured during a hunting accident). His third son, Tigranes the Younger, who showed great care for his injured father and was rewarded for his loyalty, has already been mentioned. He is also alleged to have led a military campaign in 82 BCE. Tigranes was succeeded by his fourth and youngest son, Artavasdes II.

One daughter of Tigranes according to Cassius Dio married Mithridates I of Atropatene. Another daughter married Parthian prince Pacorus, son of Orodes II. Parchments of Avroman also mention his third daughter, Ariazate "Automa", who married Gotarzes I of Parthia.

Although Cleopatra of Pontus is usually considered to be their mother (Appian writes that she gave birth to three sons), historian Gagik Sargsyan considered only Artavasdes II and one of the unnamed daughters to be her children. According to him, the rest had a different mother and were born before Tigranes became king. The reasoning behind it is that if Tigranes the Younger did indeed lead a campaign in 82 BCE, then he and hence his two older brothers (and possibly two sisters) would be too old to be Cleopatra's children. Another argument supporting this claim would be the situation with Ariazate. As she was probably the mother of Orodes I, then Ariazate could not have been the daughter of Cleopatra who married Tigranes only in 94 BCE at the age of 15 or 16. Sargsyan also proposed a possible candidate as Tigranes's first wife and the children's mother: Artaxiad princess Zaruhi, a daughter of Tigranes's paternal uncle Zariadres and granddaughter of Artaxias I. He also considered likely that the reason for the rebellion of Tigranes's son Zariadres was the birth of Artavasdes who was declared the heir by virtue of being born to a king and not a prince.

Imperial ideology 
Tigranes is a typical example of the mixed culture of his period. The ceremonial of his court was of Achaemenid origin, and also incorporated Parthian aspects. He had Greek rhetoricians and philosophers in his court, possibly as a result of the influence of his queen, Cleopatra. Greek was also possibly spoken in the court. Following the example of the Parthians, Tigranes adopted the title of Philhellene ("friend of the Greeks"). The layout of his capital Tigranocerta was a blend of Greek and Iranian architecture.

Like the majority Armenia's inhabitants, Tigranes was a follower of Zoroastrianism. On his crown, a star of divinity and two birds of prey are displayed, both Iranian aspects. The bird of prey was associated with the khvarenah, i.e. kingly glory. It was possibly also a symbol of the bird of the deity Verethragna. Alternatively, the star on his crown may depict Halley's Comet, which passed in 87 BC.

Legacy and recognition

Over the course of his conquests, Tigranes founded four cities that bore his name, including the capital of Tigranocerta (Tigranakert).

Historical
Tigranes is mentioned in Macrobii, a Roman essay detailing the famous long livers of the day, which is attributed to Lucian.

In The Art of War (1521), Italian political philosopher Niccolò Machiavelli attributes Tigranes' military failure to his excessive reliance on his cavalry.

According to one count, 24 operas have been composed about Tigranes by European composers, including by prominent Italian and German composers, such as Alessandro Scarlatti (Tigrane, 1715), Antonio Vivaldi (La virtu trionfante dell'amore e dell'odio ovvero il Tigrane, 1724), Niccolò Piccinni (Tigrane, 1761), Tomaso Albinoni, Giovanni Bononcini, Francesco Gasparini, Pietro Alessandro Guglielmi, Johann Adolph Hasse, Giovanni Battista Lampugnani, Vincenzo Righini, Antonio Tozzi, and others.

Modern
According to Razmik Panossian, Tigranes' short-lived empire has been a source of pride for modern Armenian nationalists. Nevertheless, his empire was a multi-ethnic one.

The phrase "sea to sea Armenia" (tsovits tsov Hayastan) is a popular expression used by Armenians to refer to the kingdom of Tigranes which extended from the Caspian Sea to the Mediterranean Sea.

See also
History of Armenia

Notes

References

Bibliography

English
 
 .
 
 
 
 
 
 

 .

 
 
 
 

 
 
 
  
 
Russian

 

 

French

German

Armenian

Further reading

140 BC births
55 BC deaths
1st-century BC kings of Armenia
1st-century BC rulers
1st-century BC rulers in Europe
1st-century BC rulers in Asia
People of the Roman Republic
Artaxiad dynasty
1st century BC in Armenia
Prisoners and detainees of the Parthian Empire